Mahmudabad (also Romanized as Maḩmūdābād; also known as Maḩmūdābād-e Pīr Banow) is a village in Qarah Bagh Rural District, in the Central District of Shiraz County, Fars Province, Iran. At the 2006 census, its population was 955, in 223 families.

References 

Populated places in Shiraz County